Marie-Ange Wirtz (born 7 March 1963) is a Seychellois sprinter. She competed in the women's 100 metres at the 1984 Summer Olympics.

References

1963 births
Living people
Athletes (track and field) at the 1984 Summer Olympics
Seychellois female sprinters
Seychellois female long jumpers
Olympic athletes of Seychelles
World Athletics Championships athletes for Seychelles
Place of birth missing (living people)